Eslövs BK is a Swedish football club located in Eslöv.

Background
Eslövs Bollklubb were formed in 1969 following the merger of Eslövs Allmänna ldrottsförening (EAI) and Eslövs Idrottsklubb (EIK). EAI were founded in 1908 and were the dominant club until the 1940s. EIK were formed in 1932 and in later years were the more successful of the Eslöv clubs.

Eslövs BK currently plays in Division 2 Västra Götaland which is the fourth tier of Swedish football. They play their home matches at the Ekevalla in Eslöv.

The club is affiliated to Skånes Fotbollförbund. Eslövs BK played in the 2006 Svenska Cupen and beat Tvååkers IF 4–2 in the first round before losing 0–1 at home to Assyriska Föreningen in the second round.

Season to season

Footnotes

External links
 Eslövs BK – Official website
 Eslövs BK on Facebook

Sport in Skåne County
Football clubs in Skåne County
1969 establishments in Sweden
Association football clubs established in 1969